The anti-lag system (ALS) is a method of reducing turbo lag or effective compression used on turbocharged engines to minimize turbo lag on racing or performance cars. It works by delaying the ignition timing and adding extra fuel (and sometimes air) to balance an inherent loss in combustion efficiency with increased pressure at the charging side of the turbo. This is achieved as an excess amount of fuel/air mixture escapes through the exhaust valves and combusts in the hot exhaust manifold spooling the turbocharger creating higher usable pressure.

Overview 
ALS was first used in the early days of turbocharged cars in Formula One racing circa mid to late 1980s, until fuel restrictions made its use unsuitable. Later it became a common feature in rally cars because of the increased turbo lag from the mandated restrictors at the intake manifold inlet. Due to the pressure drop across the restriction, the pressure ratio for a given boost level is much higher and the turbocharger must spin much faster to produce the same boost as when the engine operates without restriction. This increases turbo lag significantly compared to unrestricted turbochargers.

An ALS requires an air bypass, generally done in one of two ways. The first method is to use a throttle air bypass; this may be an external bypass valve or a solenoid valve which opens the throttle 12-20 degrees. This allows air to bypass the closed throttle and to reach the engine. The second method is to use a bypass valve that feeds charge air directly to the exhaust manifold.

Methods

Throttle bypass, or throttle kick ALS 
The throttle bypass/throttle solenoid system is combined with ignition retardation and slight fuel enrichment (mainly to provide cooling), typically ignition occurs at 35-45° ATDC. This late ignition causes very little expansion of the gas in the cylinder; hence the pressure and temperature will still be very high when the exhaust valve opens. At the same time, the amount of torque delivered to the crankshaft will be very small (just enough to keep the engine running). The higher exhaust pressure and temperature combined with the increased mass flow is enough to keep the turbocharger spinning at high speed thus reducing lag. When the throttle is opened up again the ignition and fuel injection goes back to normal operation. Since many engine components are exposed to very high temperatures during ALS operation and also high-pressure pulses, this kind of system is very hard on the engine, turbocharger and exhaust manifold. For the latter not only the high temperatures are a problem but also the uncontrolled turbo speeds which can quickly destroy the turbocharger. In most applications the ALS is automatically shut down when the coolant reaches a temperature of 110–115 °C to prevent overheating.

Secondary air injection, or inlet bypass 
An ALS working with a bypass valve that feeds air directly to the exhaust manifold can be made more refined than the system described above. Some of the earliest systems of this type were used by Ferrari in F1. Another well-known application of this type of anti-lag system was in the WRC version of the 1995 Mitsubishi Lancer Evolution III and Toyota Celica GT-Four (ST205). Brass tubes fed air from the turbocharger's Compressor Bypass Valve (CBV) to each of the exhaust manifold tracts, in order to provide the necessary air for the combustion of the fuel. The system was controlled by two pressure valves, operated by the ECU. Besides the racing version, the hardware of the anti-lag system was also installed in the 2500 "Group A homologation base WRC method car" street legal Celica GT-Fours. However, in these cars the system was disabled and inactive. The tubes and valves were only present for homologation reasons. On the Mitsubishi Evolution later series (Evolution IV-IX, JDM models only) the SAS (Secondary Air System) can be activated to provide anti-lag.
Mitsubishi Antilag system diagram 
Secondary air injection ALS

Turbo and intercooler bypass (D-valve) 
A method by which a large one-way check valve is inserted just prior to the throttle body, enabling air to bypass the turbo, intercooler, and piping during periods where there is negative air pressure at the throttle body inlet.  This results in more air combusting, which means more air driving the turbine side of the turbo.  As soon as positive pressure is reached in the intercooler hosing, the valve closes.

Sometimes referred to as the Dan Culkin valve. This is less of a true anti-lag system than it is a quick spool system. This method could be combined with other ALS methods.

When used in a MAF configuration, the D-valve should draw air through the MAF to maintain proper A/F ratios.  This is not necessary in a speed-density configuration.

Ignition Retard & Fuel Dump (WOT) 
Many programmable ECU's/ECU software also offer an "anti-lag" feature designed for spooling turbos off the line or between shifts. The end result is similar but the method of action is a bit different from the versions described above (which are far more common in high-level professional motorsports such as rally) and is more commonly used for launching & drag racing. As with the above D valve, this is less of a true anti-lag system than it is a quick spool system - although this more closely approximates a true ALS. This method can also be combined with any other methods.

When a car, ready for launch is being held at its launch RPM limit some ECUs (whether by switch or additional throttle) can be programmed to retard the ignition by quite a few degrees and add a lot more fuel. This causes the combustion event to happen much later, as the engine is driving the air/fuel mixture out of the cylinder, closer to the turbine, causing it to spool up either at an earlier RPM than it would normally or make much more boost at the launch RPM than it would have without engaging this feature.

Some software can also engage this "fuel dump and ignition retard" anti-lag method by clutch input (used with full-throttle shifting), effectively making it work between shifts. Like other types of anti-lag, overuse of this type of anti-lag can cause damage to the turbine wheel, manifold and more due to the violent pressures created when the air/fuel mixture spontaneously combusts from the heat of the turbine housing or is ignited by a very retarded ignition event (happening after the exhaust stroke begins) and can potentially cause popping/flames.

This form of "anti-lag" tends to work well because the times it is active, the throttle is held at 100% allowing more air into the engine. Consequently, this type of anti-lag won't work (well or at all) at part/closed throttle, unless combined with a secondary air system/throttle bypass as described above.

Using an MGU-H (Motor Generator Unit - Heat) to eliminate turbo lag 
Modern Formula One power units are turbocharged, six cylinder engines in V formation, with an additional hybrid system. The hybrid system consists of two motor generator units. These units are referred to as; The "Motor Generator Unit - Kinetic" (MGU-K), and the "Motor Generator Unit - Heat" (MGU-H) . 

To almost entirely eliminate turbo lag, the electrical energy that is stored in the car's onboard battery, is deployed (in part) to an electric motor that rapidly spins the compressor turbine. This allows the turbo system to create peak boost pressures, almost immediately, negating any turbo lag. 

During normal race conditions, the electric motor input power is gradually reduced, as the RPM increases and the exhaust gasses are able to sustain the desired boost pressures. 

During qualifying laps and sometimes used strategically through the race, energy can be deployed to the MGU-H, even when the engine is running at high RPM. This allows for the exhaust gasses to bypass the turbo, via the wastegate/s. This is said to increase power 5-10%, although at a cost to stored energy levels. 

The MGU-H can also be used to generate electrical energy, by allowing the electric motor that usually spins the turbine, to be spun by the turbo system itself. This scenario exists when exhaust gasses are being routed through the turbo and the turbo system is operating in a conventional manner. This is known as "harvesting". Although this scenario comes at a cost to overall power, it allows for a net gain for reduction in overall lap times. This is because harvesting is done in sections of the track that do not require peak power levels, for example; at the end of straights or at the exit of, and between some corners where peak torque is not required or calculations have ascertained that the loss in torque in those sections of the track, is made up for in sections where the generated power can be deployed.

Usage 
World Rally Championship cars use anti-lag systems which feed air directly to the exhaust system. The system works by bypassing charge air directly to the exhaust manifold which acts as a combustor when fuel rich exhaust from the engine meets up with the fresh air from the bypass. This will provide a continuous combustion limited to the exhaust manifold which significantly reduces the heat and pressure loads on the engine and turbocharger. With the latest anti-lag systems the bypass valve can not only be opened or closed but it can actually control the flow of air to the exhaust manifold very accurately. The turbocharger is fitted with a turbo speed sensor and the engine management system has a map based on throttle position and car speed which is used to find a suitable turbocharger speed and boost pressure for every condition. When the engine alone can't provide enough exhaust energy to reach the turbo speed/boost demanded by the management system, the bypass valve opens and exhaust manifold combustion begins. This not only reduces turbo load, but it also allows boost to be produced at very low engine speeds where boost was previously limited by compressor surge or exhaust energy. With relatively high boost at low speeds, this makes the low end torque superior even to large naturally aspirated engines. This kind of system has reached such a refinement that it is even possible to use the system in a road car. A recent example is the Prodrive P2 prototype.

Sources
 
 

Auto racing equipment
Engine technology
Turbochargers